Berkelium(III) chloride also known as berkelium trichloride, is a chemical compound with the formula BkCl3. It is a water-soluble green salt with a melting point of 603 °C. This compound forms the hexahydrate, BkCl3·6H2O.

Preparation and reactions
This compound was first prepared in 1970 by reacting hydrogen chloride gas and berkelium(IV) oxide or berkelium(III) oxide at 520 °C:
Bk2O3 + 6HCl → 2BkCl3 + 3H2O

Berkelium(III) chloride reacts with beryllocene to produce berkelocene(Bk(C5H5)3). It also reacts with oxalic acid to produce berkelium oxalate. This reaction is used to purify this compound, by reacting the oxalate with hydrochloric acid.

Structure
Anhydrous berkelium(III) chloride has a hexagonal crystal structure, is isostructural to uranium trichloride, and has the person symbol hP6. When heated it its melting point, it converts to an orthorhombic phase. However, the hexahydrate has a monoclinic crystal structure and is isostructural to americium trichloride hexahydrate with the lattice constants a = 966 pm, b = 654 pm and c = 797 pm. This hexahydrate consists of BkCl2(OH2)6+ ions and Cl− ions.

Complexes
Caesium sodium berkelium chloride is known with the formula Cs2NaBkCl6 and is produced by the reaction of berkelium(III) hydroxide, hydrochloric acid, and caesium chloride.

References

Berkelium compounds
Chlorides